Gertrude Sterroll was a British stage and film actress.

Selected filmography
 Bars of Iron (1920)
 The Shadow Between (1920)
 Dicky Monteith (1922)
 Potter's Clay (1922)
 The Glorious Adventure (1922)
 The Wine of Life (1924)
 A Romance of Mayfair (1925)
 A Daughter in Revolt (1928)
 His Grace Gives Notice (1933)
 She Was Only a Village Maiden (1933)

References

External links
 

Year of birth unknown
Year of death unknown
English film actresses
English silent film actresses
English stage actresses
People from Weybridge
20th-century English actresses